Ashik Qurbani or Kurbani is  one of the most prominent ashiks of all times.

He was a contemporary of Shah Ismail and  may have served as the court musician. According to folk traditions, Qurbani became an ashik via divine intervention in a dream. In the same dream, he  sees a big palace and a beautiful maiden in the garden. The girl is also looking at him. A Saint holds one hand of the girl; the second Saint holds the other and puts a love potion into the hand of the girl... Qurbani opens his eyes while he is trying to embrace
the girl, but realizes that it has all been a dream. Thus he falls in love with the maiden whose name was Perizat (Pari). This tradition is the basis of a famous ashik hikaye, known as "Qurbani and Pari".

Qurbani's compositions

Qurbani's compositions were handed down as gems of oral art  from generation to generation and constitute a necessary repertoire of every ashik. A famous qushma, titled Violet, starts as the following: 
Başina mən dönüm ala göz Pəri, --- (O my dearest, my love, my beautiful green-eyed Pari)
Adətdir dərələr yaz bənəvşəni. --- (Custom bids us pluck violets when spring days begin)
Ağ nazik əlinən dər dəstə bağla, --- (With your tender white hand gather a nosegay,)
Tər buxaq altinə düz bənəvşəni... --- (Pin it under your dainty chin.....)

References

Ashiks
Iranian Azerbaijanis
16th-century Iranian poets
1477 births
Year of death missing
Azerbaijani-language poets